The Arab Institute for Statistics, formally the Arab Institute for Training and Research in Statistics (AITRS) is an intergovernmental statistical institute serving the National Statistical Offices in all Arab League countries established in 1971 by the United Nations Development Programme (UNDP) under the name "Regional Institute for training and Research in Statistics for the Near East".

Board of Trustees 
The Board of Trustees is composed of the heads of the national statistical offices in all Arab League countries. They meet once per year.

See also
Arab League
Arab Fund for Economic and Social Development (AFESD)
Bloudan Conference (1937)
Council of Arab Economic Unity (CAEU)
General Union of Chambers of Commerce, Industry and Agriculture for Arab Countries
International Confederation of Arab Trade Unions
List of national and international statistical services

External links 
  Arab Institute for Training and Research in Statistics (official site).
  The League of Arab States
 United Nations Statistics Division
 SESRIC - Statistical, Economic and Social Research and Training Centre for Islamic Countries
 FAO Regional Office for Near East and North Africa

Arab League
International research institutes for mathematics
Statistics education